George Louch (1746–1811) was an English cricketer and match organiser during the 18th century. He was especially noted for his fielding and was an early stalwart of Marylebone Cricket Club.

He was a native of Chatham and educated at Westminster school. He played regularly for Chatham Cricket Club until 1773 and is not known to have played again until 1783. In all he made 134 recorded appearances in major matches.  Only the Earl of Winchilsea (128) and William Bullen (119) were anywhere near his total when he retired.

In August 1789, it was reported in the press that Louch had been killed on the field by "a ball from the point of the bat, struck with such force that it lodged in his body". He survived the injury and was back in action the following season.

When Louch died, the Kentish Gazette of 7 May 1811 carried this notice: "Died April 29 at Ramsgate after a short illness, George Louch Esq, deeply regretted by all who knew him".

References
 Fresh Light on 18th Century Cricket by G B Buckley (FL18)
 The Dawn of Cricket by H T Waghorn (WDC)
 Scores & Biographies, Volume 1 by Arthur Haygarth (SBnnn)
 The Glory Days of Cricket by Ashley Mote (GDC)
 John Nyren's "The Cricketers of my Time" by Ashley Mote

English cricketers
English cricketers of 1701 to 1786
English cricketers of 1787 to 1825
Kent cricketers
Middlesex cricketers
Hampshire cricketers
Marylebone Cricket Club cricketers
Surrey cricketers
1746 births
1811 deaths
Sportspeople from Chatham, Kent
White Conduit Club cricketers
Left-Handed v Right-Handed cricketers
Surrey and Marylebone Cricket Club cricketers
Gentlemen of England cricketers
Cricket patrons
West Kent cricketers
Old Westminsters cricketers
Hampshire and Marylebone Cricket Club cricketers
Middlesex and Marylebone Cricket Club cricketers